Håkon Tysdal (17 February 1947 - 30 September 2019) was a Norwegian writer from Enebakk in Akershus. He lived in Rælingen. He was editor of det lokalhistoriske tidsskriftet IGN and wrote many local history articles and books.

Bibliography
 Hans Borgen. Historien om bonden, politikeren og organisasjonsmannen. Saeculum forlaget. Biography. 2015
 Følge pengene. Kolofon forlag. Novel. 2014
 Etter freden. Kolofon forlag. Novel. 2013
 Arbeidsplassene som forsvant.(m. Andreas Bøhler og Amund Ruud). Enebakk historielag. 2012
 Det går på skinner - da dampen tok over for gampen. (m. Odd Kjell Sjegstad). Flisbyn forlag. 2012
 Avdukingen. Kolofon forlag. Novel. 2012
 Dagny og Dan. Kolofon forlag. Novel. 2011
 Næringslivet på 1950-tallet: Skedsmo, Lørenskog og Rælingen.(Red.) Flisbyn forlag. 2010
 Romerike mens nasjonen våkner 1750-1850.(Red. m/ fler). Årbok for Romerike historielag. 2009
 Fra Ign til Fontana Di Trevi - en reise gjennom Ragnhild Jølsens siste leveår. Enebakk historielag 2008.
 Dampskipet Strømmen og livet på Øyeren (flere forfattere). Flisbyn Forlag 2006.
 Romerike i barokk og rokokko: 1600 - 1700-tallet (ed.). Årbok for Romerike historielag 2005.
 Bedre medieomtale (w. Odd Kjell Skjegstad). Odd Forlag 2003.
 Ordbok for tannteknikere og tannhelsesekretærer (w. Roald Arne Larby). 1991.
 Informasjonsvirksomhet (w. Odd Kjell Skjegstad). 1990.

External links
 Jølsens siste leveår, Østlandets Blad, March 2008.
 Flisbyen Lokalhistoriske Bokblogg, Håkon Tysdal's personal blog.

Norwegian non-fiction writers
People from Enebakk
People from Rælingen
1947 births
2019 deaths